Currently, there are 26 banks in Azerbaijan, one of which is the state (The Central Bank of Azerbaijan) and 25 are private commercial banks.

Central bank
 Central Bank of Azerbaijan

Commercial banks

Defunct banks   
AtaBank  
Azal Bank
Bank Silk Way
Debutbank
DemirBank
Dresdner Bank
Evrobank
PAŞA Bank
AGBank (1992-2020)
Amrahbank (1993-2020)
AtaBank (1993-2020)
NBCBank (1992-2020)
Vahid bank
Zaminbank (1992-2016)
KredoBank (1994-2016)
United Credit Bank (1996-2016)
Bank of Azerbaijan (1993-2016)
Ganjabank (1994-2016)
Parabank (1991-2016)
Bank Technique (1994-2016)
Royal Bank (1993-2012)
DekaBank (1989-2016)
Atrabank (1992-2016)
Caspian Development Bank
Bank Standard (1995-2016)
DemirBank (1989-2017)
Caucasus Development Bank (-2016)

References

External links

 The list of the banks in Azerbaijan Banks.az 

 

Banks
Azerbaijan
Azerbaijan
Azerbaijan